Perin, Perín, or Périn is a given name and surname.

Given name
Perin Del Vaga (1501–1547), Italian painter
Perin Jamsetjee Mistri (1913–1989), Indian architect

Surname
Blanca Cerón Perín (born 1974), Spanish swimmer
John Perin (born 1948), Australian footballer
Lié Louis Périn-Salbreux (1753–1817), French artist
Mattia Perin (born 1992), Italian footballer
Bernardo Perin (1897–1964), Italian footballer
Meral Perin (born 1965), Turkish German actress
Michel Périn (born 1957), French rally navigator
Michel Périn (cyclist) (born 1947), French cyclist
René Perin (1774–1858), French playwright
Sophie Perin (born 1957), French beauty pageant winner
Walis Perin (born 1952), Taiwanese Seediq politician